Sumardi (born 26 June 1972) is an Indonesian footballer.

References

External links

1972 births
Association football goalkeepers
Living people
Indonesian footballers
Liga 1 (Indonesia) players
Indonesian Premier Division players
Persisam Putra Samarinda players
Bontang F.C. players
Mitra Kukar players